The 2012 Copa Colombia, officially the 2012 Copa Postobón for sponsorship reasons, was the 10th edition of the Copa Colombia, the national cup competition for clubs of DIMAYOR. It began on February 14 and ended on November 7. The tournament comprised a total of 36 teams. The winner earned a berth to the 2013 Copa Sudamericana.

Group phase
The 36 teams are divided into six groups based on each separate region of Colombia. The group winners and runners-up advance to the Round of 16, along with the four best third-placed teams. The matches were played from February 14 to June 21.

Group A
Comprises teams from the Caribbean and Atlantic regions.

Group B
Comprises teams from the Paisa region and Sucre.

Group C
Comprises teams from the Santander and Boyacá regions.

Group D
Comprises teams from the capital district of Bogotá and Soacha.

Group E
Comprises teams from the Pacific region.

Group F
Comprises teams in the Coffee Zone, Great Tolima, and Zipaquirá town.

Ranking of third-placed teams

Knockout phase
All ties in the knockout phase are played in two-legged format. In case of a tie in points and goal difference (i.e., aggregate score), neither the away goals rule nor extra time is applied, and the tie is decided by a penalty shoot-out.

Bracket
Teams playing the second leg at home marked by †. This is determined by which team have the better overall record up to the stage they meet each other, except in the round of 16 where the group winners automatically play the second leg at home.

Round of 16
First legs: August 8, 9, 15; Second legs: August 22 and 23.

Quarterfinals
First legs: September 5, 6 and 12; Second legs: September 12 and 19.

Semifinals
First legs: October 17; Second legs: October 24.

Final
First leg: October 31; Second leg: November 7.

Top goalscorers

References

External links
 Copa Postobón
 Copa Postobón, DIMAYOR.com
 Official regulations 
 Copa Colombia 2012, Soccerway.com

Copa Colombia seasons
Colombia
Copa Colombia